Kenareh or Konareh may refer to:
 Kenareh, Bushehr
 Konareh, Arsanjan, Fars Province
 Kenareh, Marvdasht, Fars Province
 Konareh, Rostam, Fars Province
 Konareh, Hormozgan
 Kenareh Rural District, in Fars Province